João Paulo Dias Fernandes (born 9 November 1992), commonly known as Paulinho, is a Portuguese professional footballer who plays for Primeira Liga club Sporting CP as a striker.

He amassed Primeira Liga totals of 177 matches and 54 goals over seven seasons, representing Gil Vicente, Braga and Sporting CP (for whom he signed in January 2021 for €16 million), winning the 2019–20 Taça da Liga and the 2020–21 Taça de Portugal with the second of those clubs and the 2020–21 national championship and the 2021 Supertaça Cândido de Oliveira with the third. In the Segunda Liga, he played with Trofense and Gil.

Paulinho won his first cap for Portugal in 2020, scoring twice in his first appearance.

Club career

Trofense
Born in Barcelos, Braga District, Paulinho started playing with local amateurs Santa Maria. In 2012 he signed with Segunda Liga club Trofense, making his debut as a professional on 29 July by playing the full 90 minutes in a 5–1 away loss against Aves in the group stage of the Taça da Liga. His maiden appearance in the league took place on 12 August, in a 2–0 defeat to the same opponent where he also started.

Gil Vicente
In the 2013 off-season, after scoring 11 goals during the season, Paulinho moved to the Primeira Liga with Gil Vicente. He made his debut in the competition on 18 August, coming on as a 49th-minute substitute in a 2–0 home win over Académica de Coimbra. He netted his first goal on 24 November of the same year, but in a 3–2 loss at Marítimo.

During the 2016–17 campaign, with the team again in the second tier, Paulinho scored a career-best 19 times for a runner-up position in the individual charts.

Braga
On 24 May 2017, Paulinho moved to Braga on a four-year contract. He finished his first year as team top scorer at 13 – 17 across all competitions – helping them to qualify for the group phase of the UEFA Europa League after ranking fourth in the league.

Paulinho was the top scorer of the 2018–19 Taça da Liga, netting braces in group stage wins against Nacional (5–0 at home) and Vitória de Setúbal (4–0 away). In the next year's edition he scored twice for the winners, including a last-minute winner over Sporting CP in the semi-final. On the league front he set a new personal best in the top flight, including a hat-trick in a 5–1 away rout of Paços de Ferreira on 10 July 2020.

On 26 November 2020, Paulinho scored in a 3–3 home draw with Leicester City in the Europa League group stages; in doing so he beat Alan's record of 11 European goals for Braga. He scored all of his side's goals in a 3–1 victory against Estoril on 17 December to make the League Cup semi-finals.

Sporting CP
On 1 February 2021, Paulinho joined Sporting on a deal running until June 2025 for a club-record €16 million fee, reuniting with former Braga manager Rúben Amorim; as part of the arrangement, Cristian Borja and Andraž Šporar moved in the opposite direction. On 11 May, his 36th-minute goal was the only of the home fixture against Boavista, and the club won the domestic league for the first time in 19 years.

Paulinho scored three times in the group stage of the 2021–22 UEFA Champions League, helping his team progress as runners-up. On 29 December 2021, he netted a hat-trick in a 3–2 home win over Portimonense in the domestic league.

Paulinho topped the scoring charts of the 2022–23 League Cup with eight goals. However, in the 2–0 final loss to Porto, he was sent off for two quick yellow cards, being later handed a three-match suspension for insulting the refereeing team.

International career
Paulinho won his only cap for the Portugal under-21 team on 14 November 2012, playing the last 18 minutes of the 3–2 friendly defeat of Scotland. In May 2018, he was included by full side manager Fernando Santos in a preliminary 35-man squad for the upcoming edition of the FIFA World Cup in Russia, but did not make the final cut.

On 11 November 2020, Paulinho made his senior debut in a home exhibition against Andorra, scoring twice in a 7–0 win. In October 2022, he was one of 55 players pre-selected for the 2022 World Cup in Qatar.

Career statistics

Club

International
Scores and results list Portugal's goal tally first, score column indicates score after each Paulinho goal.

Honours
Braga
Taça de Portugal: 2020–21
Taça da Liga: 2019–20

Sporting CP
Primeira Liga: 2020–21
Taça da Liga: 2021–22
Supertaça Cândido de Oliveira: 2021

Individual
Taça da Liga top scorer: 2022–23 (8 goals)

References

External links

1992 births
Living people
People from Barcelos, Portugal
Sportspeople from Braga District
Portuguese footballers
Association football forwards
Primeira Liga players
Liga Portugal 2 players
Santa Maria F.C. players
C.D. Trofense players
Gil Vicente F.C. players
S.C. Braga players
Sporting CP footballers
Portugal under-21 international footballers
Portugal international footballers